Francis Albert Sinatra (December 12, 1915 – May 14, 1998) was an American singer and actor. Nicknamed the "Chairman of the Board" and later called "Ol' Blue Eyes", Sinatra was one of the most popular entertainers of the 1940s, 1950s, and 1960s. He is among the world's best-selling music artists with an estimated 150 million record sales.

Born to Italian immigrants in Hoboken, New Jersey, Sinatra was greatly influenced by the intimate, easy-listening vocal style of Bing Crosby and began his musical career in the swing era with bandleaders Harry James and Tommy Dorsey. He found success as a solo artist after signing with Columbia Records in 1943, becoming the idol of the "bobby soxers". Sinatra released his debut album, The Voice of Frank Sinatra, in 1946. When his film career stalled in the early 1950s, Sinatra turned to Las Vegas, where he became one of its best-known residency performers and part of the famous Rat Pack. His acting career was revived by the 1953 film From Here to Eternity, which earned Sinatra an Academy Award and a Golden Globe Award for Best Supporting Actor. Sinatra then signed with Capitol Records and released several critically lauded albums, some of which were later considered as among the first "concept albums", including In the Wee Small Hours (1955), Songs for Swingin' Lovers! (1956), Come Fly with Me (1958), Only the Lonely (1958), No One Cares (1959), and Nice 'n' Easy (1960).

Sinatra left Capitol in 1960 to start his own record label, Reprise Records, and released a string of successful albums. In 1965, he recorded the retrospective album September of My Years and starred in the Emmy-winning television special Frank Sinatra: A Man and His Music. After releasing Sinatra at the Sands, recorded at the Sands Hotel and Casino in Vegas with frequent collaborator Count Basie in early 1966, the following year he recorded one of his most famous collaborations with Tom Jobim, the album Francis Albert Sinatra & Antonio Carlos Jobim. It was followed by 1968's Francis A. & Edward K. with Duke Ellington. Sinatra retired for the first time in 1971, but came out of retirement two years later. He recorded several albums and resumed performing at Caesars Palace, and released "New York, New York" in 1980. Using his Las Vegas shows as a home base, he toured within the United States and internationally until shortly before his death in 1998.

Sinatra forged a highly successful career as a film actor. After winning an Academy Award for best supporting actor in From Here to Eternity, he starred in The Man with the Golden Arm (1955) and The Manchurian Candidate (1962). Sinatra also appeared in musicals such as On the Town (1949), Guys and Dolls (1955), High Society (1956), and Pal Joey (1957), which won him another Golden Globe. Toward the end of his career, he frequently played detectives, including the title character in Tony Rome (1967). Sinatra received the Golden Globe Cecil B. DeMille Award in 1971. On television, The Frank Sinatra Show began on CBS in 1950, and he continued to make appearances on television throughout the 1950s and 1960s.

While Sinatra never learned how to read music, he worked very hard from a young age to improve his abilities in all aspects of music. A perfectionist, renowned for his style and presence, Sinatra always insisted on recording live with his band. He led a colorful personal life and was  involved in turbulent relationships, including his second marriage to Ava Gardner. He later married Mia Farrow in 1966 and Barbara Marx in 1976. Sinatra had several violent confrontations, often with journalists he felt had crossed him or work bosses with whom he had disagreements. He was deeply involved with politics starting in the mid-1940s and actively campaigned for presidents Franklin D. Roosevelt, Harry S. Truman, John F. Kennedy and Ronald Reagan. Sinatra was investigated by the FBI for his alleged relationship with the Mafia.

Sinatra was honored at the Kennedy Center Honors in 1983, was awarded the Presidential Medal of Freedom by Ronald Reagan in 1985, and the Congressional Gold Medal in 1997. He received eleven Grammy Awards, including the Grammy Trustees Award, Grammy Legend Award and the Grammy Lifetime Achievement Award. Sinatra was included in Time magazine's compilation of the 20th century's 100 most influential people. American music critic Robert Christgau called him "the greatest singer of the 20th century" and he continues to be regarded as an iconic figure.

Early life 

Francis Albert Sinatra was born on December 12, 1915, in an upstairs tenement at 415 Monroe Street in Hoboken, New Jersey, the only child of Italian immigrants Natalina "Dolly" Garaventa and Antonino Martino "Marty" Sinatra, who boxed under the name Marty O'Brien. When he was in an unconscious state, his grandmother resuscitated him by running her grandson under cold water until he gasped his first breath. Due to his injuries at birth, his baptism at St. Francis Church in Hoboken was delayed until April 2, 1916. A childhood operation on his mastoid bone left major scarring on his neck, and during adolescence he suffered from cystic acne that further scarred his face and neck. Sinatra was raised in the Catholic Church.

Sinatra's mother was energetic and driven, and biographers believe that she was the dominant factor in the development of her son's personality traits and self-confidence. Sinatra's fourth wife Barbara would later claim that Dolly was abusive to him when he was a child, and "knocked him around a lot". Dolly became influential in Hoboken and in local Democratic Party circles. She worked as a midwife, earning $50 for each delivery, and according to Sinatra biographer Kitty Kelley, also ran an illegal abortion service that catered to Italian Catholic girls, for which she was nicknamed "Hatpin Dolly". She also had a gift for languages and served as a local interpreter.

Sinatra's illiterate father was a bantamweight boxer  who later worked for 24 years at the Hoboken Fire Department, working his way up to captain. Sinatra spent much time at his parents' tavern in Hoboken, working on his homework and occasionally singing a song on top of the player piano for spare change. During the Great Depression, Dolly provided money to her son for outings with friends and to buy expensive clothes, resulting in neighbors describing him as the "best-dressed kid in the neighborhood". Excessively thin and small as a child and young man, Sinatra's skinny frame later became a staple of jokes during stage shows.

At a young age, Sinatra developed an interest in music, particularly big band jazz  and listened to Gene Austin, Rudy Vallée, Russ Colombo, and Bob Eberly while idolizing Bing Crosby. For his 15th birthday, his maternal uncle, Domenico, gave him a ukulele, and with the instrument, he performed at family gatherings. Sinatra attended David E. Rue Jr. High School from 1928, and A. J. Demarest High School (since renamed as Hoboken High School) in 1931, where he arranged bands for school dances, but left without graduating after having attended only 47 days before being expelled for "general rowdiness". To please his mother, he enrolled at Drake Business School, but departed after 11 months. Dolly found her son work as a delivery boy at the Jersey Observer newspaper, where his godfather Frank Garrick worked, and after that, worked as a riveter at the Tietjen and Lang shipyard. He began performing in local Hoboken social clubs such as The Cat's Meow and The Comedy Club, and sang for free on radio stations such as WAAT in Jersey City. In New York, Sinatra found jobs singing for his supper or for cigarettes. To improve his speech, he began taking elocution lessons for a dollar each from vocal coach John Quinlan, who was one of the first people to notice his impressive vocal range.

Music career

Hoboken Four, Harry James, and Tommy Dorsey (1935–1939) 

Sinatra began singing professionally as a teenager, but even though he never learned to read music, he learned music by ear. He got his first break in 1935 when his mother persuaded a local singing group called the 3 Flashes to let him join. Baritone Fred Tamburro stated that "Frank hung around us like we were gods or something", admitting that they only took him on board because he owned a car and could chauffeur the group around. Sinatra soon learned they were auditioning for the Major Bowes Amateur Hour show, and "begged" the group to let him in on the act. With Sinatra, the group became known as the Hoboken Four, and passed an audition from Edward Bowes to appear on the Major Bowes Amateur Hour show. They each earned $12.50 for the appearance, and ended up attracting 40,000 votes before winning first prize — a six-month contract to perform on stage and radio across the U.S. Sinatra quickly became the group's lead singer, and, much to the jealousy of his fellow group members, garnered most of the attention from girls. Due to the success of the group, Bowes kept asking for them to return, disguised under different names, varying from "The Secaucus Cockamamies" to "The Bayonne Bacalas".

In 1938, Sinatra found employment as a singing waiter at a roadhouse called "The Rustic Cabin" in Englewood Cliffs, New Jersey, for which he was paid $15 a week. The roadhouse was connected to the WNEW radio station in New York City, and he began performing with a group live during the Dance Parade show. Despite the low salary, Sinatra felt that this was the break he was looking for, and boasted to friends that he was going to "become so big that no one could ever touch him". In March 1939, saxophone player Frank Mane, who knew Sinatra from Jersey City radio station WAAT where both performed on live broadcasts, arranged for him to audition and record "Our Love", his first solo studio recording. In June, bandleader Harry James, who had heard Sinatra sing on "Dance Parade", signed a two-year contract of $75 a week one evening after a show at the Paramount Theatre in New York. It was with the James band that Sinatra released his first commercial record "From the Bottom of My Heart" in July. No more than 8,000 copies of the record were sold, and further records released with James through 1939, such as "All or Nothing at All", also had weak sales on their initial release. Thanks to his vocal training, Sinatra could now sing two tones higher, and developed a repertoire which included songs such as "My Buddy", "Willow Weep for Me", "It's Funny to Everyone but Me", "Here Comes the Night", "On a Little Street in Singapore", "Ciribiribin", and "Every Day of My Life".

Sinatra became increasingly frustrated with the status of the Harry James band, feeling that he was not achieving the major success and acclaim he was looking for. His pianist and close friend Hank Sanicola persuaded him to stay with the group, but in November 1939 he left James to replace Jack Leonard as the lead singer of the Tommy Dorsey band. Sinatra earned $125 a week, appearing at the Palmer House in Chicago, and James released Sinatra from his contract. On January 26, 1940, he made his first public appearance with the band at the Coronado Theatre in Rockford, Illinois, opening the show with "Stardust". Dorsey recalled: "You could almost feel the excitement coming up out of the crowds when the kid stood up to sing. Remember, he was no matinée idol. He was just a skinny kid with big ears. I used to stand there so amazed I'd almost forget to take my own solos". Dorsey was a major influence on Sinatra and became a father figure. Sinatra copied Dorsey's mannerisms and traits, becoming a demanding perfectionist like him, even adopting his hobby of toy trains. He asked Dorsey to be godfather to his daughter Nancy in June 1940. Sinatra later said that "The only two people I've ever been afraid of are my mother and Tommy Dorsey". Though Kelley says that Sinatra and drummer Buddy Rich were bitter rivals, other authors state that they were friends and even roommates when the band was on the road, but professional jealousy surfaced as both men wanted to be considered the star of Dorsey's band. Later, Sinatra helped Rich form his own band with a $25,000 loan and provided financial help to Rich during times of the drummer's serious illness.

In his first year with Dorsey, Sinatra recorded over forty songs. Sinatra's first vocal hit was the song "Polka Dots and Moonbeams" in late April 1940. Two more chart appearances followed with "Say It" and "Imagination", which was Sinatra's first top-10 hit. His fourth chart appearance was "I'll Never Smile Again", topping the charts for twelve weeks beginning in mid-July. Other records with Tommy Dorsey issued by RCA Victor include "Our Love Affair" and "Stardust" in 1940; "Oh! Look at Me Now", "Dolores", "Everything Happens to Me", and "This Love of Mine" in 1941; "Just as Though You Were There", "Take Me", and "There Are Such Things" in 1942; and "It Started All Over Again", "In the Blue of Evening", and "It's Always You" in 1943. As his success and popularity grew, Sinatra pushed Dorsey to allow him to record some solo songs. Dorsey eventually relented, and on January 19, 1942, Sinatra recorded "Night and Day", "The Night We Called It a Day", "The Song is You", and "Lamplighter's Serenade" at a Bluebird recording session, with Axel Stordahl as arranger and conductor. Sinatra first heard the recordings at the Hollywood Palladium and Hollywood Plaza and was astounded at how good he sounded. Stordahl recalled: "He just couldn't believe his ears. He was so excited, you almost believed he had never recorded before. I think this was a turning point in his career. I think he began to see what he might do on his own".

After the 1942 recordings, Sinatra believed he needed to go solo, with an insatiable desire to compete with Bing Crosby, but he was hampered by his contract which gave Dorsey 43% of Sinatra's lifetime earnings in the entertainment industry.  A legal battle ensued, eventually settled in August 1942. On September 3, 1942, Dorsey bade farewell to Sinatra, reportedly saying as Sinatra left, "I hope you fall on your ass", but he was more gracious on the air when replacing Sinatra with singer Dick Haymes. Rumors began spreading in newspapers that Sinatra's mobster godfather, Willie Moretti, coerced Dorsey to let Sinatra out of his contract for a few thousand dollars, holding a gun to his head. Upon leaving Dorsey, Sinatra persuaded Stordahl to come with him and become his personal arranger, offering him $650 a month, five times his salary from Dorsey. Dorsey and Sinatra, who had been very close, never reconciled their differences.  Up until his death in November 1956, Dorsey occasionally made biting comments about Sinatra to the press such as "he's the most fascinating man in the world, but don't put your hand in the cage".

Onset of Sinatramania and role in World War II (1942–1945) 

By May 1941, Sinatra topped the male singer polls in Billboard and DownBeat magazines. His appeal to bobby soxers, as teenage girls of that time were called, revealed a whole new audience for popular music, which had been recorded mainly for adults up to that time. The phenomenon became officially known as "Sinatramania" after his "legendary opening" at the Paramount Theatre in New York on December 30, 1942. According to Nancy Sinatra, Jack Benny later said, "I thought the goddamned building was going to cave in. I never heard such a commotion... All this for a fellow I never heard of." Sinatra performed for four weeks at the theatre, his act following the Benny Goodman orchestra, after which his contract was renewed for another four weeks by Bob Weitman due to his popularity. He became known as "Swoonatra" or "The Voice", and his fans "Sinatratics". They organized meetings and sent masses of letters of adoration, and within a few weeks of the show, some 1000 Sinatra fan clubs had been reported across the US. Sinatra's publicist, George Evans, encouraged interviews and photographs with fans, and was the man responsible for depicting Sinatra as a vulnerable, shy, Italian–American with a rough childhood who made good. When Sinatra returned to the Paramount in October 1944 only 250 persons left the first show, and 35,000 fans left outside caused a near riot, known as the Columbus Day Riot, outside the venue because they were not allowed in.  Such was the bobby-soxer devotion to Sinatra that they were known to write Sinatra's song titles on their clothing, bribe hotel maids for an opportunity to touch his bed, and accost his person in the form of stealing clothing he was wearing, most commonly his bow-tie.

Sinatra signed with Columbia Records as a solo artist on June 1, 1943, during the 1942–44 musicians' strike. Columbia Records re-released Harry James and Sinatra's August 1939 version of "All or Nothing at All", which reached number 2 on June 2, and was on the best-selling list for 18 weeks. He initially had great success, and performed on the radio on Your Hit Parade from February 1943 until December 1944, and on stage. Columbia wanted new recordings of their growing star as quickly as possible, so Alec Wilder was hired as an arranger and conductor for several sessions with a vocal group called the Bobby Tucker Singers. These first sessions were on June 7, June 22, August 5, and November 10, 1943. Of the nine songs recorded during these sessions, seven charted on the best-selling list. That year he also made his first solo nightclub appearance at New York's Riobamba, and a successful concert in the Wedgewood Room of the prestigious Waldorf-Astoria New York that year secured his popularity in New York high society. Sinatra released "You'll Never Know", "Close to You", "Sunday, Monday, or Always" and "People Will Say We're in Love" as singles. By the end of 1943 he was more popular in a DownBeat poll than Bing Crosby, Perry Como, Bob Eberly, and Dick Haymes.

Sinatra did not serve in the military during World War II. On December 11, 1943, he was officially classified 4-F ("Registrant not acceptable for military service") by his draft board because of a perforated eardrum. However, U.S. Army files reported that Sinatra had actually been rejected because he was "not acceptable material from a psychiatric viewpoint;" his emotional instability was hidden to avoid "undue unpleasantness for both the selectee and the induction service". Briefly, there were rumors reported by columnist Walter Winchell that Sinatra paid $40,000 to avoid military service, but the FBI found this to be without merit.

Toward the end of the war, Sinatra entertained the troops during several successful overseas USO tours with comedian Phil Silvers. During one trip to Rome he met the Pope, who asked him if he was an operatic tenor.  Sinatra worked frequently with the popular Andrews Sisters in radio in the 1940s, and many USO shows were broadcast to troops via the Armed Forces Radio Service (AFRS). In 1944 Sinatra released "I Couldn't Sleep a Wink Last Night" as a single and recorded his own version of Crosby's "White Christmas", and the following year he released "I Dream of You (More Than You Dream I Do)", "Saturday Night (Is the Loneliest Night of the Week)", "Dream", and "Nancy (with the Laughing Face)" as singles.

Columbia years and career slump (1946–1952) 
Despite being heavily involved in political activity in 1945 and 1946, in those two years Sinatra sang on 160 radio shows, recorded 36 times, and shot four films. By 1946 he was performing on stage up to 45 times a week, singing up to 100 songs daily, and earning up to $93,000 a week.

In 1946 Sinatra released "Oh! What it Seemed to Be", "Day by Day", "They Say It's Wonderful", "Five Minutes More", and "The Coffee Song" as singles, and launched his first album, The Voice of Frank Sinatra,  which reached No. 1 on the Billboard chart. William Ruhlmann of AllMusic wrote that Sinatra "took the material very seriously, singing the love lyrics with utter seriousness", and that his "singing and the classically influenced settings gave the songs unusual depth of meaning". He was soon selling 10million records a year. Such was Sinatra's command at Columbia that his love of conducting was indulged with the release of the set Frank Sinatra Conducts the Music of Alec Wilder, an offering unlikely to appeal to Sinatra's core fanbase at the time, which consisted of teenage girls. The following year he released his second album, Songs by Sinatra, featuring songs of a similar mood and tempo such as Irving Berlin's "How Deep is the Ocean?" and Harold Arlen's and Jerome Kern's "All The Things You Are". "Mam'selle", composed by Edmund Goulding with lyrics by Mack Gordon for the film The Razor's Edge (1946), was released as a single. Sinatra had competition; versions by Art Lund, Dick Haymes, Dennis Day, and The Pied Pipers also reached the top ten of the Billboard charts. In December he recorded "Sweet Lorraine" with the Metronome All-Stars, featuring talented jazz musicians such as Coleman Hawkins, Harry Carney and Charlie Shavers, with Nat King Cole on piano, in what Charles L. Granata describes as "one of the highlights of Sinatra's Columbia epoch".

Sinatra's third album, Christmas Songs by Sinatra, was originally released in 1948 as a 78rpm album set, and a 10" LP record was released two years later. When Sinatra was featured as a priest in The Miracle of the Bells, due to press negativity surrounding his alleged Mafia connections at the time, it was announced to the public that Sinatra would donate his $100,000 in wages from the film to the Catholic Church. By the end of 1948, Sinatra had slipped to fourth on DownBeats annual poll of most popular singers (behind Billy Eckstine, Frankie Laine, and Bing Crosby). and in the following year he was pushed out of the top spots in polls for the first time since 1943. Frankly Sentimental (1949) was panned by DownBeat, who commented that "for all his talent, it seldom comes to life".

Though "The Hucklebuck" reached the top ten, it was his last single release under the Columbia label. Sinatra's last two albums with Columbia, Dedicated to You and Sing and Dance with Frank Sinatra, were released in 1950. Sinatra would later feature a number of the Sing and Dance with Frank Sinatra album's songs, including "Lover", "It's Only a Paper Moon", "It All Depends on You", on his 1961 Capitol release, Sinatra's Swingin' Session!!!.

Cementing the low of his career was the death of publicist George Evans from a heart attack in January 1950 at 48. According to Jimmy Van Heusen, Sinatra's close friend and songwriter, Evans's death to him was "an enormous shock which defies words", as he had been crucial to his career and popularity with the bobbysoxers. Sinatra's reputation continued to decline as reports broke out in February of his affair with Ava Gardner and the destruction of his marriage to Nancy, though he insisted that his marriage had long been over even before he had met Gardner. In April, Sinatra was engaged to perform at the Copa club in New York, but had to cancel five days of the booking due to suffering a submucosal hemorrhage of the throat. Evans once said that whenever Sinatra suffered from a bad throat and loss of voice it was always due to emotional tension which "absolutely destroyed him".

In financial difficulty following his divorce and career decline, Sinatra was forced to borrow $200,000 from Columbia to pay his back taxes after MCA refused to front the money. Rejected by Hollywood, he turned to Las Vegas and made his debut at the Desert Inn in September 1951, and also began singing at the Riverside Hotel in Reno, Nevada. Sinatra became one of Las Vegas's pioneer residency entertainers,  and a prominent figure on the Vegas scene throughout the 1950s and 1960s onwards, a period described by Rojek as the "high-water mark" of Sinatra's "hedonism and self absorption". Rojek notes that the Rat Pack "provided an outlet for gregarious banter and wisecracks", but argues that it was Sinatra's vehicle, possessing an "unassailable command over the other performers". Sinatra would fly to Las Vegas from Los Angeles in Van Heusen's single-engine plane. On October 4, 1953, Sinatra made his first performance at the Sands Hotel and Casino, after an invitation by the manager Jack Entratter, who had previously worked at the Copa in New York. Sinatra typically performed there three times a year, and later acquired a share in the hotel.

Sinatra's decline in popularity was evident at his concert appearances. At a brief run at the Paramount in New York he drew small audiences. At the Desert Inn in Las Vegas he performed to half-filled houses of wildcatters and ranchers. At a concert at Chez Paree in Chicago, only 150 people in a 1,200-seat capacity venue turned up to see him. By April 1952 he was performing at the Kauai County Fair in Hawaii. Sinatra's relationship with Columbia Records was also disintegrating, with A&R executive Mitch Miller claiming he "couldn't give away" the singer's records. Though several notable recordings were made during this time period, such as "If I Could Write a Book" in January 1952, which Granata sees as a "turning point", forecasting his later work with its sensitivity, Columbia and MCA dropped him later that year. His last studio recording for Columbia, "Why Try To Change Me Now", was recorded in New York on September 17, 1952, with orchestra arranged and conducted by Percy Faith.  Journalist Burt Boyar observed, "Sinatra had had it. It was sad. From the top to the bottom in one horrible lesson."

Career revival and the Capitol years (1953–1962) 

The release of the film From Here to Eternity in August 1953 marked the beginning of a remarkable career revival. Tom Santopietro notes that Sinatra began to bury himself in his work, with an "unparalleled frenetic schedule of recordings, movies and concerts", in what authors Anthony Summers and Robbyn Swan describe as "a new and brilliant phase". On March 13, 1953, Sinatra met with Capitol Records vice president Alan Livingston and signed a seven-year recording contract. His first session for Capitol took place at KHJ studios at Studio C, 5515 Melrose Avenue in Los Angeles, with Axel Stordahl conducting. The session produced four recordings, including "I'm Walking Behind You", Sinatra's first Capitol single. After spending two weeks on location in Hawaii filming From Here to Eternity, Sinatra returned to KHJ on April 30 for his first recording session with Nelson Riddle, an established arranger and conductor at Capitol who was Nat King Cole's musical director. After recording the first song, "I've Got the World on a String", Sinatra offered Riddle a rare expression of praise, "Beautiful!", and after listening to the playbacks, he could not hide his enthusiasm, exclaiming, "I'm back, baby, I'm back!"

In subsequent sessions in May and November 1953, Sinatra and Riddle developed and refined their musical collaboration, with Sinatra providing specific guidance on the arrangements. Sinatra's first album for Capitol, Songs for Young Lovers, was released on January 4, 1954, and included "A Foggy Day", "I Get a Kick Out of You", "My Funny Valentine", "Violets for Your Furs" and "They Can't Take That Away from Me", songs which became staples of his later concerts. That same month, Sinatra released the single "Young at Heart", which reached No. 2 and was awarded Song of the Year. In March, he recorded and released the single "Three Coins in the Fountain", a "powerful ballad" that reached No. 4. Sinatra's second album with Riddle, Swing Easy!, which reflected his "love for the jazz idiom" according to Granata, was released on August 2 of that year and included "Just One of Those Things", "Taking a Chance on Love", "Get Happy", and "All of Me". Swing Easy! was named Album of the Year by Billboard, and he was also named "Favorite Male Vocalist" by Billboard, DownBeat, and Metronome that year. Sinatra came to consider Riddle "the greatest arranger in the world", and Riddle, who considered Sinatra "a perfectionist", offered equal praise of the singer, observing, "It's not only that his intuitions as to tempo, phrasing, and even configuration are amazingly right, but his taste is so impeccable... there is still no one who can approach him."

In 1955 Sinatra released In the Wee Small Hours, his first 12" LP,  featuring songs such as "In the Wee Small Hours of the Morning", "Mood Indigo", "Glad to Be Unhappy" and "When Your Lover Has Gone". According to Granata it was the first concept album of his to make a "single persuasive statement", with an extended program and "melancholy mood". Sinatra embarked on his first tour of Australia the same year. Another collaboration with Riddle resulted in the development of Songs for Swingin' Lovers!, sometimes seen as one of his best albums, which was released in March 1956. It features a recording of "I've Got You Under My Skin" by Cole Porter, something which Sinatra paid meticulous care to, taking a reported 22 takes to perfect.

His February 1956 recording sessions inaugurated the studios at the Capitol Records Building, complete with a 56-piece symphonic orchestra. According to Granata his recordings of "Night and Day", "Oh! Look at Me Now" and "From This Moment On" revealed "powerful sexual overtones, stunningly achieved through the mounting tension and release of Sinatra's best-teasing vocal lines", while his recording of "River, Stay 'Way from My Door" in April demonstrated his "brilliance as a syncopational improviser". Riddle said that Sinatra took "particular delight" in singing "The Lady is a Tramp", commenting that he "always sang that song with a certain amount of salaciousness", making "cue tricks" with the lyrics. His penchant for conducting was displayed again in 1956's Frank Sinatra Conducts Tone Poems of Color, an instrumental album that has been interpreted to be a catharsis to his failed relationship with Gardner. Also that year, Sinatra sang at the Democratic National Convention, and performed with The Dorsey Brothers for a week soon afterwards at the Paramount Theatre.

In 1957, Sinatra released Close to You, A Swingin' Affair! and Where Are You?—his first album in stereo, with Gordon Jenkins. Granata considers "Close to You" to have been thematically his closest concept album to perfection during the "golden" era, and Nelson Riddle's finest work, which was "extremely progressive" by the standards of the day. It is structured like a three-act play, each commencing with the songs "With Every Breath I Take", "Blame It on My Youth" and  "It Could Happen to You". For Granata, Sinatra's A Swingin' Affair! and swing music predecessor Songs for Swingin' Lovers! solidified "Sinatra's image as a 'swinger', from both a musical and visual standpoint". Buddy Collette considered the swing albums to have been heavily influenced by Sammy Davis Jr., and stated that when he worked with Sinatra in the mid-1960s he approached a song much differently than he had done in the early 1950s. On June 9, 1957, he performed in a 62-minute concert conducted by Riddle at the Seattle Civic Auditorium, his first appearance in Seattle since 1945. The recording was first released as a bootleg, but in 1999 Artanis Entertainment Group officially released it as the Sinatra '57 in Concert live album, after Sinatra's death. In 1958 Sinatra released the concept album Come Fly with Me with Billy May, designed as a musical world tour. It reached the top spot on the Billboard album chart in its second week, remaining at the top for five weeks, and was nominated for the Grammy Award for Album of the Year at the inaugural Grammy Awards. The title song, "Come Fly With Me", written especially for him, would become one of his best known standards. On May 29 he recorded seven songs in a single session, more than double the usual yield of a recording session, and an eighth, "Lush Life", was abandoned as Sinatra found it too technically demanding. In September, Sinatra released Frank Sinatra Sings for Only the Lonely, a stark collection of introspective saloon songs and blues-tinged ballads which proved a huge commercial success, spending 120 weeks on Billboards album chart and peaking at No.1. Cuts from this LP, such as "Angel Eyes" and "One for My Baby (and One More for the Road)", would remain staples of the "saloon song" segments of Sinatra's concerts.

In 1959, Sinatra released Come Dance with Me!, a highly successful, critically acclaimed album which stayed on Billboard's Pop album chart for 140 weeks, peaking at No. 2. It won the Grammy Award for Album of the Year, as well as Best Vocal Performance, Male and Best Arrangement for Billy May. He also released No One Cares in the same year, a collection of "brooding, lonely" torch songs, which critic Stephen Thomas Erlewine thought was "nearly as good as its predecessor Where Are You?, but lacked the "lush" arrangements of it and the "grandiose melancholy" of Only the Lonely.

In the words of Kelley, by 1959, Sinatra was "not simply the leader of the Rat Pack" but had "assumed the position of il padrone in Hollywood". He was asked by 20th Century Fox to be the master of ceremonies at a luncheon attended by Soviet Premier Nikita Khrushchev on September 19, 1959. Nice 'n' Easy, a collection of ballads, topped the  Billboard chart in October 1960 and remained in the charts for 86 weeks,  winning critical plaudits. Granata noted the "lifelike ambient sound" quality of Nice and Easy, the perfection in the stereo balance, and the "bold, bright and snappy" sound of the band. He highlighted the "close, warm and sharp" feel of Sinatra's voice, particularly on the songs "September in the Rain", "I Concentrate on You", and "My Blue Heaven".

Reprise years (1960–1981) 
Sinatra grew discontented at Capitol, and fell into a feud with Alan Livingston, which lasted over six months. His first attempt at owning his own label was with his pursuit of buying declining jazz label, Verve Records, which ended once an initial agreement with Verve founder, Norman Granz, "failed to materialize". He decided to form his own label, Reprise Records and, in an effort to assert his new direction, temporarily parted with Riddle, May and Jenkins, working with other arrangers such as Neil Hefti, Don Costa, and Quincy Jones. Sinatra built the appeal of Reprise Records as one in which artists were promised creative control over their music, as well as a guarantee that they would eventually gain "complete ownership of their work, including publishing rights." Under Sinatra the company developed into a music industry "powerhouse", and he later sold it for an estimated $80million. His first album on the label, Ring-a-Ding-Ding! (1961), was a major success, peaking at No.4 on Billboard. The album was released in February 1961, the same month that Reprise Records released Ben Webster's The Warm Moods, Sammy Davis Jr.'s The Wham of Sam, Mavis River's Mavis and Joe E. Lewis's It is Now Post Time. During the initial years of Reprise, Sinatra was still under contract to record for Capitol, completing his contractual commitment with the release of Point of No Return, recorded over a two-day period on September 11 and 12, 1961.

In 1962, Sinatra released Sinatra and Strings, a set of standard ballads arranged by Don Costa, which became one of the most critically acclaimed works of Sinatra's entire Reprise period. Frank Jr., who was present during the recording, noted the "huge orchestra", which Nancy Sinatra stated "opened a whole new era" in pop music, with orchestras getting bigger, embracing a "lush string sound". Sinatra and Count Basie collaborated for the album Sinatra-Basie the same year, a popular and successful release which prompted them to rejoin two years later for the follow-up It Might as Well Be Swing, arranged by Quincy Jones.  The two became frequent performers together, and appeared at the Newport Jazz Festival in 1965. Also in 1962, as the owner of his own record label, Sinatra was able to step on the podium as conductor again, releasing his third instrumental album Frank Sinatra Conducts Music from Pictures and Plays.

In 1963, Sinatra reunited with Nelson Riddle for The Concert Sinatra, an ambitious album featuring a 73-piece symphony orchestra arranged and conducted by Riddle. The concert was recorded on a motion picture scoring soundstage with the use of multiple synchronized recording machines that employed an optical signal onto 35mm film designed for movie soundtracks. Granata considers the album to have been "impeachable" [sic], "one of the very best of the Sinatra-Riddle ballad albums", in which Sinatra displayed his vocal range, particularly in "Ol' Man River", in which he darkened the hue.

In 1964 the song "My Kind of Town" was nominated for the Academy Award for Best Original Song. Sinatra released Softly, as I Leave You, and collaborated with Bing Crosby and Fred Waring on America, I Hear You Singing, a collection of patriotic songs recorded as a tribute to the assassinated President John F. Kennedy. Sinatra increasingly became involved in charitable pursuits in this period. In 1961 and 1962 he went to Mexico, with the sole purpose of putting on performances for Mexican charities, and in July 1964 he was present for the dedication of the Frank Sinatra International Youth Center for Arab and Jewish children in Nazareth.

Sinatra's phenomenal success in 1965, coinciding with his 50th birthday, prompted Billboard to proclaim that he may have reached the "peak of his eminence". In June 1965, Sinatra, Sammy Davis Jr., and Dean Martin played live in St. Louis to benefit Dismas House, a prisoner rehabilitation and training center with nationwide programs that in particular helped serve African Americans. The Rat Pack concert, called The Frank Sinatra Spectacular, was broadcast live via satellite to numerous movie theaters across America. The album September of My Years was released September 1965, and went on to win the Grammy Award for best album of the year. Granata considers the album to have been one of the finest of his Reprise years, "a reflective throwback to the concept records of the 1950s, and more than any of those collections, distills everything that Frank Sinatra had ever learned or experienced as a vocalist". One of the album's singles, "It Was a Very Good Year", won the Grammy Award for Best Vocal Performance, Male. A career anthology, A Man and His Music, followed in November, winning Album of the Year at the Grammys the following year.

In 1966 Sinatra released That's Life, with both the single of "That's Life" and album becoming Top Ten hits in the US on Billboards pop charts. Strangers in the Night went on to top the Billboard and UK pop singles charts, winning the award for Record of the Year at the Grammys. Sinatra's first live album, Sinatra at the Sands, was recorded during January and February 1966 at the Sands Hotel and Casino in Las Vegas. Sinatra was backed by the Count Basie Orchestra, with Quincy Jones conducting. Sinatra pulled out from the Sands the following year, when he was driven out by its new owner Howard Hughes, after a fight.

Sinatra started 1967 with a series of recording sessions with Antônio Carlos Jobim. He recorded one of his collaborations with Jobim, the Grammy-nominated album Francis Albert Sinatra & Antônio Carlos Jobim, which was one of the best-selling albums of the year, behind the Beatles's Sgt. Pepper's Lonely Hearts Club Band. According to Santopietro the album "consists of an extraordinarily effective blend of bossa nova and slightly swinging jazz vocals, and succeeds in creating an unbroken mood of romance and regret". Writer Stan Cornyn wrote that Sinatra sang so softly on the album that it was comparable to the time that he suffered from a vocal hemorrhage in 1950.

Sinatra also released the album The World We Knew, which features a chart-topping duet of "Somethin' Stupid" with daughter Nancy. In December, Sinatra collaborated with Duke Ellington on the album Francis A. & Edward K.. According to Granata, the recording of "Indian Summer" on the album was a favorite of Riddle's, noting the "contemplative mood [which] is heightened by a Johnny Hodges alto sax solo that will bring a tear to your eye". With Sinatra in mind, singer-songwriter Paul Anka wrote the song "My Way", using the melody of the French "Comme d'habitude" ("As Usual"), composed by Claude François and Jacques Revaux. Sinatra recorded it in one take, just after Christmas 1968. "My Way", Sinatra's best-known song on the Reprise label, was not an instant success, charting at No. 27 in the US and No. 5 in the UK, but it remained in the UK charts for 122 weeks, including 75 non-consecutive weeks in the Top 40, between April 1969 and September 1971, which was still a record in 2015. Sinatra told songwriter Ervin Drake in the 1970s that he "detested" singing the song, because he believed audiences would think it was a "self-aggrandizing tribute", professing that he "hated boastfulness in others". According to NPR, My Way has become one the most requested songs at funerals.

In an effort to maintain his commercial viability in the late 1960s, Sinatra would record works by Paul Simon ("Mrs. Robinson"), the Beatles ("Yesterday"), and Joni Mitchell ("Both Sides, Now") in 1969.

"Retirement" and return (1970–1981) 

In 1970, Sinatra released Watertown, a critically acclaimed concept album, with music by Bob Gaudio (of the Four Seasons) and lyrics by Jake Holmes. However, it sold a mere 30,000 copies that year and reached a peak chart position of 101. He left Caesars Palace in September that year after an incident in which executive Sanford Waterman pulled a gun on him. He performed several charity concerts with Count Basie at the Royal Festival Hall in London. On November 2, 1970, Sinatra recorded the last songs for Reprise Records before his self-imposed retirement, announced the following June at a concert in Hollywood to raise money for the Motion Picture and TV Relief Fund. He gave a "rousing" performance of "That's Life", and finished the concert with a Matt Dennis and Earl Brent song, "Angel Eyes" which he had recorded on the Only The Lonely album in 1958. He sang the last line."'Scuse me while I disappear." The spotlight went dark and he left the stage.  He told LIFE journalist Thomas Thompson that "I've got things to do, like the first thing is not to do  at all for eight months... maybe a year", while Barbara Sinatra later said that Sinatra had grown "tired of entertaining people, especially when all they really wanted were the same old tunes he had long ago become bored by". While he was in retirement, President Richard Nixon asked him to perform at a Young Voters Rally in anticipation of the upcoming campaign. Sinatra obliged and chose to sing "My Kind of Town" for the rally held in Chicago on October 20, 1972.

In 1973, Sinatra came out of his short-lived retirement with a television special and album. The album, entitled Ol' Blue Eyes Is Back, arranged by Gordon Jenkins and Don Costa, was a success, reaching number 13 on Billboard and number 12 in the UK. The television special, Magnavox Presents Frank Sinatra, reunited Sinatra with Gene Kelly. He initially developed problems with his vocal cords during the comeback due to a prolonged period without singing. That Christmas he performed at the Sahara Hotel in Las Vegas, and returned to Caesars Palace the following month in January 1974, despite previously vowing to perform there again [sic]. He began what Barbara Sinatra describes as a "massive comeback tour of the United States, Europe, the Far East and Australia". In July, while on a second tour of Australia, he caused an uproar by describing journalists there– who were aggressively pursuing his every move and pushing for a press conference– as "bums, parasites, fags, and buck-and-a-half hookers". After he was pressured to apologize, Sinatra instead insisted that the journalists apologize for "fifteen years of abuse I have taken from the world press". Union actions cancelled concerts and grounded Sinatra's plane, essentially trapping him in Australia. In the end, Sinatra's lawyer, Mickey Rudin, arranged for Sinatra to issue a written conciliatory note and a final concert that was televised to the nation. In October 1974 he appeared at New York City's Madison Square Garden in a televised concert that was later released as an album under the title The Main Event – Live. Backing him was bandleader Woody Herman and the Young Thundering Herd, who accompanied Sinatra on a European tour later that month.

In 1975, Sinatra performed in concerts in New York with Count Basie and Ella Fitzgerald, and at the London Palladium with Basie and Sarah Vaughan, and in Tehran at Aryamehr Stadium, giving 140 performances in 105 days. In August he held several consecutive concerts at Lake Tahoe together with the newly-risen singer John Denver, who became a frequent collaborator. Sinatra had recorded Denver's "Leaving on a Jet Plane" and "My Sweet Lady" for Sinatra & Company (1971), and according to Denver, his song "A Baby Just Like You" was written at Sinatra's request for his new grandchild, Angela. During the Labor Day weekend held in 1976, Sinatra was responsible for reuniting old friends and comedy partners Dean Martin and Jerry Lewis for the first time in nearly twenty years, when they performed at the "Jerry Lewis MDA Telethon". That year, the Friars Club selected him as the "Top Box Office Name of the Century", and he was given the Scopus Award by the American Friends of the Hebrew University of Jerusalem in Israel and an honorary Doctor of Humane Letters from the University of Nevada.

Sinatra continued to perform at Caesars Palace in the late 1970s, and was performing there in January 1977 when his mother Dolly died in a plane crash on the way to see him. He cancelled two weeks of shows and spent time recovering from the shock in Barbados. In March, he performed in front of Princess Margaret at the Royal Albert Hall in London, raising money for the National Society for the Prevention of Cruelty to Children. On March 14, he recorded with Nelson Riddle for the last time, recording the songs "Linda", "Sweet Loraine", and "Barbara". The two men had a major falling out, and later patched up their differences in January 1985 at a dinner organized for Ronald Reagan, when Sinatra asked Riddle to make another album with him. Riddle was ill at the time, and died that October, before they had a chance to record.

In 1978, Sinatra filed a $1million lawsuit against a land developer for using his name in the "Frank Sinatra Drive Center" in West Los Angeles. During a party at Caesars in 1979, he was awarded the Grammy Trustees Award, while celebrating 40 years in show business and his 64th birthday. That year, former President Gerald Ford awarded Sinatra the International Man of the Year Award, and he performed in front of the Egyptian pyramids for Anwar Sadat, which raised more than $500,000 for Sadat's wife's charities.

In 1980, Sinatra's first album in six years was released, Trilogy: Past Present Future, a highly ambitious triple album that features an array of songs from both the pre-rock era and rock era. It was the first studio album of Sinatra's to feature his touring pianist at the time, Vinnie Falcone, and was based on an idea by Sonny Burke. The album garnered six Grammy nominations– winning for best liner notes– and peaked at number 17 on Billboard's album chart, and spawned yet another song that would become a signature tune, "Theme from New York, New York". That year, as part of the Concert of the Americas, he performed in the Maracanã Stadium in Rio de Janeiro, Brazil, which broke records for the "largest live paid audience ever recorded for a solo performer". The following year, Sinatra built on the success of Trilogy with She Shot Me Down, an album that was praised for embodying the dark tone of his Capitol years. Also in 1981, Sinatra was embroiled in controversy when he worked a ten-day engagement for $2million in Sun City, in the internationally unrecognized Bophuthatswana, breaking a cultural boycott against apartheid-era South Africa. President Lucas Mangope awarded Sinatra with the highest honor, the Order of the Leopard, and made him an honorary tribal chief.

Later career and final projects (1982–1998) 

Santopietro stated that by the early 1980s, Sinatra's voice had "coarsened, losing much of its power and flexibility, but audiences didn't care". In 1982, he signed a $16million three-year deal with the Golden Nugget of Las Vegas. Kelley notes that by this period Sinatra's voice had grown "darker, tougher and loamier", but he "continued to captivate audiences with his immutable magic". She added that his baritone voice "sometimes cracked, but the gliding intonations still aroused the same raptures of delight as they had at the Paramount Theater". That year he made a reported further $1.3million from the Showtime television rights to his "Concert of the Americas" in the Dominican Republic, $1.6million for a concert series at Carnegie Hall, and $250,000 in just one evening at the Chicago Fest. He donated a lot of his earnings to charity. He put on a performance at the White House for the Italian prime minister, and performed at the Radio City Music Hall with Luciano Pavarotti and George Shearing.

Sinatra was honored at 1983 Kennedy Center Honors, alongside Katherine Dunham, James Stewart, Elia Kazan, and Virgil Thomson. Quoting Henry James, President Reagan said in honoring his old friend that "art was the shadow of humanity" and that Sinatra had "spent his life casting a magnificent and powerful shadow". On September 21, 1983, Sinatra filed a $2million court case against Kitty Kelley, suing her for punitive damages, before her unofficial biography, His Way, was even published. The book became a best-seller for "all the wrong reasons" and "the most eye-opening celebrity biography of our time", according to William Safire of The New York Times. Sinatra was always adamant that such a book would be written on his terms, and he himself would "set the record straight" in details of his life. According to Kelley, the family detested her and the book, which took its toll on Sinatra's health. Kelley says that Tina Sinatra blamed her for her father's colon surgery in 1986. He was forced to drop the case on September 19, 1984, with several leading newspapers expressing concerns about his views on censorship.

In 1984, Sinatra worked with Quincy Jones for the first time in nearly two decades on the album, L.A. Is My Lady, which was well received critically. The album was a substitute for another Jones project, an album of duets with Lena Horne, which had to be abandoned. In 1986, Sinatra collapsed on stage while performing in Atlantic City and was hospitalized for diverticulitis, which left him looking frail. Two years later, Sinatra reunited with Martin and Davis and went on the Rat Pack Reunion Tour, during which they played many large arenas. When Martin dropped out of the tour early on, a rift developed between them and the two never spoke again.

On June 6, 1988, Sinatra made his last recordings with Reprise for an album which was not released. He recorded "My Foolish Heart", "Cry Me a River", and other songs. Sinatra never completed the project, but take number 18 of "My Foolish Heart" may be heard in The Complete Reprise Studio Recordings (1995).

In 1990, Sinatra was awarded the second "Ella Award" by the Los Angeles-based Society of Singers, and performed for a final time with Ella Fitzgerald at the award ceremony. Sinatra maintained an active touring schedule in the early 1990s, performing 65 concerts in 1990, 73 in 1991 and 84 in 1992 in seventeen different countries.

In 1993, Sinatra returned to Capitol Records and the recording studio for Duets, which became his best-selling album. The album and its sequel, Duets II, released the following year, would see Sinatra remake his classic recordings with popular contemporary performers, who added their vocals to a pre-recorded tape.
During his tours in the early 1990s, his memory failed him at times during concerts, and he fainted onstage in Richmond, Virginia, in March 1994. His final public concerts were held in Fukuoka Dome in Japan on December 19–20, 1994. The following year, Sinatra sang for the last time on February 25, 1995, before a live audience of 1200 select guests at the Palm Desert Marriott Ballroom, on the closing night of the Frank Sinatra Desert Classic golf tournament. Esquire reported of the show that Sinatra was "clear, tough, on the money" and "in absolute control". Sinatra was awarded the Legend Award at the 1994 Grammy Awards, where he was introduced by Bono, who said of him, "Frank's the chairman of the bad attitude... Rock 'n roll plays at being tough, but this guy is the boss– the chairman of boss... I'm not going to mess with him, are you?"

In 1995, to mark Sinatra's 80th birthday, the Empire State Building glowed blue. A star-studded birthday tribute, Sinatra: 80 Years My Way, was held at the Shrine Auditorium in Los Angeles, featuring performers such as Ray Charles, Little Richard, Natalie Cole and Salt-N-Pepa singing his songs. At the end of the program Sinatra performed on stage for the last time to sing the final notes of the "Theme from New York, New York" with an ensemble. In recognition of his many years of association with Las Vegas, Sinatra was elected to the Gaming Hall of Fame in 1997.

Artistry 

While Sinatra never learned how to read music well, he had a fine, natural understanding of it, and he worked very hard from a young age to improve his abilities in all aspects of music. He could follow a lead sheet (simplified sheet music showing a song's basic structure) during a performance by "carefully following the patterns and groupings of notes arranged on the page" and made his own notations to the music, using his ear to detect semitonal differences. Granata states that some of the most accomplished classically trained musicians soon noticed his musical understanding, and remarked that Sinatra had a "sixth sense", which "demonstrated unusual proficiency when it came to detecting incorrect notes and sounds within the orchestra". Sinatra was an aficionado of classical music, and would often request classical strains in his music, inspired by composers such as Puccini and Impressionist masters. His personal favorite was Ralph Vaughan Williams. He would insist on always recording live with the band because it gave him a "certain feeling" to perform live surrounded by musicians.
By the mid 1940s, such was his understanding of music that after hearing an air check of some compositions by Alec Wilder which were for strings and woodwinds, he became the conductor at Columbia Records for six of Wilder's compositions: "Air for Oboe", "Air for English Horn", "Air for Flute", "Air for Bassoon", "Slow Dance" and "Theme and Variations". The works, which combine elements of jazz and classical music, were considered by Wilder to have been among the finest renditions and recordings of his compositions, past or present. At one recording session with arranger Claus Ogerman and an orchestra, Sinatra heard "a couple of little strangers" in the string section, prompting Ogerman to make corrections to what were thought to be copyist's errors. Critic Gene Lees, a lyricist and the author of the words to the Jobim melody "This Happy Madness", expressed amazement when he heard Sinatra's recording of it on Sinatra & Company (1971), considering him to have delivered the lyrics to perfection.

Voice coach John Quinlan was impressed by Sinatra's vocal range, remarking, "He has far more voice than people think he has. He can vocalize to a B-flat on top in full voice, and he doesn't need a mic either".  As a singer, early on he was primarily influenced by Bing Crosby, but later believed that Tony Bennett was "the best singer in the business". Bennett also praised Sinatra himself, claiming that as a performer, he had "perfected the art of intimacy." According to Nelson Riddle, Sinatra had a "fairly rangy voice",  remarking that "His voice has a very strident, insistent sound in the top register, a smooth lyrical sound in the middle register, and a very tender sound in the low. His voice is built on infinite taste, with an overall inflection of sex. He points everything he does from a sexual standpoint". Despite his heavy New Jersey accent, according to Richard Schuller, when Sinatra sang his accent was barely detectable, with his diction becoming "precise" and articulation "meticulous". His timing was impeccable, allowing him, according to Charles L. Granata, to "toy with the rhythm of a melody, bringing tremendous excitement to his reading of a lyric".  Tommy Dorsey observed that Sinatra would "take a musical phrase and play it all the way through seemingly without breathing for eight, ten, maybe sixteen bars". Dorsey was a considerable influence on Sinatra's techniques for his vocal phrasing with his own exceptional breath control on the trombone, and Sinatra regularly swam and held his breath underwater, thinking of song lyrics to increase his breathing power.

Arrangers such as Nelson Riddle and Anthony Fanzo found Sinatra to be a perfectionist who constantly drove himself and others around him, stating that his collaborators approached him with a sense of uneasiness because of his unpredictable and often volatile temperament.  Granata comments that Sinatra was almost fanatically obsessed with perfection to the point that people began wondering if he was genuinely concerned about the music or showing off his power over others. On days when he felt that his voice was not right, he would know after only a few notes and would postpone the recording session until the following day, yet still pay his musicians.  After a period of performing, Sinatra tired of singing a certain set of songs and was always looking for talented new songwriters and composers to work with. Once he found ones that he liked, he actively sought to work with them as often as he could, and made friends with many of them. He once told Sammy Cahn, who wrote songs for Anchors Aweigh, "if you're not there Monday, I'm not there Monday". Over the years he recorded 87 of Cahn's songs, of which 24 were composed by Jule Styne, and 43 by Jimmy Van Heusen. The Cahn-Styne partnership lasted from 1942 until 1954, when Van Heusen succeeded him as Sinatra's main composer.

Unlike many of his contemporaries, Sinatra insisted upon direct input regarding arrangements and tempos for his recordings. He would spend weeks thinking about the songs he wanted to record, and would keep an arranger in mind for each song. If it was a mellow love song, he would ask for Gordon Jenkins. If it was a "rhythm" number, he would think of Billy May, or perhaps Neil Hefti or some other favored arranger. Jenkins considered Sinatra's musical sense to be unerring. His changes to Riddle's charts would frustrate Riddle, yet he would usually concede that Sinatra's ideas were superior. Barbara Sinatra notes that Sinatra would almost always credit the songwriter at the end of each number, and would often make comments to the audience, such as "Isn't that a pretty ballad" or "Don't you think that's the most marvelous love song", delivered with "childlike delight". She states that after each show, Sinatra would be "in a buoyant, electrically charged mood, a post-show high that would take him hours to come down from as he quietly relived every note of the performance he'd just given".

Sinatra's split with Gardner in the fall of 1953 had a profound impact on the types of songs he sang and on his voice. He began to console himself in songs with a "brooding melancholy", such as "I'm a Fool to Want You", "Don't Worry 'Bout Me", "My One and Only Love" and "There Will Never Be Another You", which Riddle believed was the direct influence of Ava Gardner. Lahr comments that the new Sinatra was "not the gentle boy balladeer of the forties. Fragility had gone from his voice, to be replaced by a virile adult's sense of happiness and hurt". Author Granata considered Sinatra a "master of the art of recording", noting that his work in the studio "set him apart from other gifted vocalists". During his career he made over 1000 recordings. Recording sessions would typically last three hours, though Sinatra would always prepare for them by spending at least an hour by the piano beforehand to vocalize, followed by a short rehearsal with the orchestra to ensure the balance of sound. During his Columbia years Sinatra used an RCA 44 microphone, which Granata describes as "the 'old-fashioned' microphone which is closely associated with Sinatra's crooner image of the 1940s", though when performing on talk shows later he used a bullet-shaped RCA 77. At Capitol he used a Neumann U47, an "ultra-sensitive" microphone which better captured the timbre and tone of his voice.

In the 1950s, Sinatra's career was facilitated by developments in technology. Up to sixteen songs could now be held by the twelve-inch L.P., and this allowed Sinatra to use song in a novelistic way, turning each track in a kind of chapter, which built and counterpointed moods to illuminate a larger theme". Santopietro writes that through the 1950s and well into the 1960s, "Every Sinatra LP was a masterpiece of one sort of another, whether uptempo, torch song, or swingin' affairs. Track after track, the brilliant concept albums redefined the nature of pop vocal art".

Film career

Debut, musical films, and career slump (1941–1952) 
Sinatra attempted to pursue an acting career in Hollywood in the early 1940s. While films appealed to him, being exceptionally self-confident, he was rarely enthusiastic about his own acting, once remarking that "pictures stink". Sinatra made his film debut performing in an uncredited sequence in Las Vegas Nights (1941), singing "I'll Never Smile Again" with Tommy Dorsey's Pied Pipers. He had a cameo role along with Duke Ellington and Count Basie in Charles Barton's Reveille with Beverly (1943), making a brief appearance singing "Night and Day". Next, he was given leading roles in Higher and Higher and Step Lively (both 1944) for RKO.

Metro-Goldwyn-Mayer cast Sinatra opposite Gene Kelly and Kathryn Grayson in the Technicolor musical Anchors Aweigh (1945), in which he played a sailor on leave in Hollywood for four days. A major success, it garnered several Academy Award wins and nominations, and the song "I Fall in Love Too Easily", sung by Sinatra in the film, was nominated for the Academy Award for Best Original Song. He briefly appeared at the end of Richard Whorf's commercially successful Till the Clouds Roll By (1946), a Technicolor musical biopic of Jerome Kern, in which he sang "Ol' Man River".

Sinatra co-starred again with Gene Kelly in the Technicolor musical Take Me Out to the Ball Game (1949), in which Sinatra and Kelly play baseball players who are part-time vaudevillians. He teamed up with Kelly for a third time in On the Town (also 1949), playing a sailor on leave in New York City. The film remains rated very highly by critics, and in 2006 it ranked No. 19 on the American Film Institute's list of best musicals. Both Double Dynamite (1951), an RKO Irving Cummings comedy produced by Howard Hughes, and Joseph Pevney's Meet Danny Wilson (1952) failed to make an impression. The New York World Telegram and Sun ran the headline "Gone on Frankie in '42; Gone in '52".

Career comeback and prime (1953–1959) 

Fred Zinnemann's From Here to Eternity (1953) deals with the tribulations of three soldiers, played by Burt Lancaster, Montgomery Clift, and Sinatra, stationed on Hawaii in the months leading up to the attack on Pearl Harbor. Sinatra had long been desperate to find a film role which would bring him back into the spotlight, and Columbia Pictures boss Harry Cohn had been inundated by appeals from people across Hollywood to give Sinatra a chance to star as "Maggio" in the film. During production, Montgomery Clift became a close friend, and Sinatra later professed that he "learned more about acting from him than anybody I ever knew before". After several years of critical and commercial decline, his Academy Award for Best Supporting Actor win helped him regain his position as the top recording artist in the world. His performance also won a Golden Globe Award for Best Supporting Actor – Motion Picture. The Los Angeles Examiner wrote that Sinatra is "simply superb, comical, pitiful, childishly brave, pathetically defiant", commenting that his death scene is "one of the best ever photographed".

Sinatra starred opposite Doris Day in the musical film Young at Heart (1954), and earned critical praise for his performance as a psychopathic killer posing as an FBI agent opposite Sterling Hayden in the film noir Suddenly (also 1954).

Sinatra was nominated for an Academy Award for Best Actor and BAFTA Award for Best Actor in a Leading Role for his role as a heroin addict in The Man with the Golden Arm (1955). After roles in Guys and Dolls, and The Tender Trap (both 1955), Sinatra was nominated for a BAFTA Award for Best Actor in a Leading Role for his role as a medical student in Stanley Kramer's directorial début, Not as a Stranger (also 1955). During production, Sinatra got drunk with Robert Mitchum and Broderick Crawford and trashed Kramer's dressing room. Kramer vowed at the time to never hire Sinatra again, and later regretted casting him as a Spanish guerrilla leader in The Pride and the Passion (1957).

Sinatra featured alongside Bing Crosby and Grace Kelly in High Society (1956) for MGM, earning a reported $250,000 for the picture. The public rushed to the cinemas to see Sinatra and Crosby together on-screen, and it ended up earning over $13million at the box office, becoming one of the highest-grossing pictures of its year. He starred opposite Rita Hayworth and Kim Novak in George Sidney's Pal Joey (1957), Sinatra, for which he won for the Golden Globe Award for Best Actor – Motion Picture Musical or Comedy. Santopietro considers the scene in which Sinatra sings "The Lady Is a Tramp" to Hayworth to have been the finest moment of his film career. He next portrayed comedian Joe E. Lewis in The Joker Is Wild (also 1957); the song "All the Way" won the Academy Award for Best Original Song. By 1958, Sinatra was one of the ten biggest box office draws in the United States, appearing with Dean Martin and Shirley MacLaine in Vincente Minnelli's Some Came Running and Kings Go Forth (both 1958) with Tony Curtis and Natalie Wood. "High Hopes", sung by Sinatra in the Frank Capra comedy, A Hole in the Head (1959), won the Academy Award for Best Original Song, and became a chart hit, lasting on the Hot 100 for 17 weeks.

Later career (1960–1980) 

Due to an obligation he owed to 20th Century Fox for walking off the set of Henry King's Carousel (1956), Sinatra starred opposite Shirley MacLaine, Maurice Chevalier and Louis Jourdan in Can-Can (1960). He earned $200,000 and 25% of the profits for the performance. Around the same time, he starred in the Las Vegas-set Ocean's 11 (also 1960), the first film to feature the Rat Pack together and the start of a "new era of screen cool" for Santopietro. Sinatra personally financed the film, and paid Martin and Davis fees of $150,000 and $125,000 respectively, sums considered exorbitant for the period. He had a leading role opposite Laurence Harvey in The Manchurian Candidate (1962), which he considered to be the role he was most excited about and the high point of his film career. Vincent Canby, writing for the magazine Variety, found the portrayal of Sinatra's character to be "a wide-awake pro creating a straight, quietly humorous character of some sensitivity." He appeared with the Rat Pack in the western Sergeants 3 (also 1962), and again in the 1964 gangster-oriented musical Robin and the 7 Hoods. For his performance in Come Blow Your Horn (1963) adapted from the Neil Simon play, he was nominated for the Golden Globe Award for Best Actor– Motion Picture Musical or Comedy.

Sinatra directed None but the Brave (1965), and Von Ryan's Express (1965) was a major success. However, in the mid 1960s, Brad Dexter wanted to "breathe new life" into Sinatra's film career by helping him display the same professional pride in his films as he did his recordings. On one occasion, he gave Sinatra Anthony Burgess's novel A Clockwork Orange (1962) to read, with the idea of making a film, but Sinatra thought it had no potential and did not understand a word.

In the late 1960s, Sinatra became known for playing detectives, including Tony Rome in Tony Rome (1967) and its sequel Lady in Cement (1968). He also played a similar role in The Detective (1968).

Sinatra starred opposite George Kennedy in the western Dirty Dingus Magee (1970), an "abysmal" affair according to Santopietro, which was panned by the critics. The following year, Sinatra received a Golden Globe Cecil B. DeMille Award and had intended to play Detective Harry Callahan in Dirty Harry (1971), but had to turn down the role due to developing Dupuytren's contracture in his hand. Sinatra's last major film role was opposite Faye Dunaway in Brian G. Hutton's The First Deadly Sin (1980). Santopietro said that as a troubled New York City homicide cop, Sinatra gave an "extraordinarily rich", heavily layered characterization, one which "made for one terrific farewell" to his film career.

Television and radio career 

After beginning on the Major Bowes Amateur Hour radio show with the Hoboken Four in 1935, and later WNEW and WAAT in Jersey City, Sinatra became the star of radio shows of his own on NBC and CBS from the early 1940s to the mid-1950s. In 1942, Sinatra hired arranger Axel Stordahl away from Tommy Dorsey before he began his first radio program that year, keeping Stordahl with him for all of his radio work. By the end of 1942, he was named the "Most Popular Male Vocalist on Radio" in a DownBeat poll. Early on he frequently worked with The Andrews Sisters on radio, and they would appear as guests on each other's shows, as well as on many USO shows broadcast to troops via the Armed Forces Radio Service (AFRS). He appeared as a special guest in the sisters' ABC Eight-to-the-Bar Ranch series, while the trio in turn guested on his Songs by Sinatra series on CBS. Sinatra had two stints as a regular member of cast of Your Hit Parade; his first was from 1943 to 1945, and second was from 1946 to May 28, 1949, during which he was paired with the then-new girl singer, Doris Day. Starting in September 1949, the BBD&O advertising agency produced a radio series starring Sinatra for Lucky Strike called Light Up Time– some 176 15-minute shows which featured Frank and Dorothy Kirsten singing– which lasted through to May 1950.

In October 1951, the second season of The Frank Sinatra Show began on CBS Television. Ultimately, Sinatra did not find the success on television for which he had hoped. Santopietro writes that Sinatra "simply never appeared fully at ease on his own television series, his edgy, impatient personality conveying a pent up energy on the verge of exploding". In 1953, Sinatra starred in the NBC radio program Rocky Fortune, portraying Rocco Fortunato (a.k.a. Rocky Fortune), a "footloose and fancy free" temporary worker for the Gridley Employment Agency who stumbles into crime-solving. The series aired on NBC radio Tuesday nights from October 1953 to March 1954.

In 1957, Sinatra formed a three-year $3million contract with ABC to launch The Frank Sinatra Show, featuring himself and guests in 36 half-hour shows. ABC agreed to allow Sinatra's Hobart Productions to keep 60% of the residuals, and bought stock in Sinatra's film production unit, Kent Productions, guaranteeing him $7million. Though an initial critical success upon its debut on October 18, 1957, it soon attracted negative reviews from Variety and The New Republic, and The Chicago Sun-Times thought that Sinatra and frequent guest Dean Martin "performed like a pair of adult delinquents", "sharing the same cigarette and leering at girls". In return, Sinatra later made numerous appearances on The Dean Martin Show and Martin's TV specials.

Sinatra's fourth and final Timex TV special, Welcome Home Elvis, was broadcast in March 1960, earning massive viewing figures. During the show, he performed a duet with Presley, who sang Sinatra's 1957 hit "Witchcraft" with the host performing the 1956 Presley classic "Love Me Tender". Sinatra had previously been highly critical of Elvis Presley and rock and roll in the 1950s, describing it as a "deplorable, a rancid smelling aphrodisiac" which "fosters almost totally negative and destructive reactions in young people." A CBS News special about the singer's 50th birthday, Frank Sinatra: A Man and His Music, was broadcast on November 16, 1965, and garnered both an Emmy award and a Peabody Award.

According his musical collaboration with Jobim and Ella Fitzgerald in 1967, Sinatra appeared in the TV special, A Man and His Music + Ella + Jobim, which was broadcast on CBS on November 13. When Sinatra came out of retirement in 1973, he released both an album and appeared in a TV special named Ol' Blue Eyes Is Back. The TV special was highlighted by a dramatic reading of "Send in the Clowns" and a song-and-dance sequence with former co-star Gene Kelly. In the late 1970s, John Denver appeared as a guest in the Sinatra and Friends ABC-TV Special, singing "September Song" as a duet.

Sinatra starred as a detective in Contract on Cherry Street (1977), cited as his "one starring role in a dramatic television film". Ten years later, he made a guest appearance opposite Tom Selleck in Magnum, P.I., playing a retired policeman who teams up with Selleck to find his granddaughter's murderer. Shot in January 1987, the episode aired on CBS on February 25.

Personal life 

Sinatra had three children, Nancy (born 1940), Frank Jr. (1944–2016) and Tina (born 1948), with his first wife, Nancy Sinatra (née Barbato, 1917–2018), to whom he was married from 1939 to 1951.

Sinatra had met Barbato in Long Branch, New Jersey in the summer of 1934, while working as a lifeguard. He agreed to marry her after an incident at "The Rustic Cabin" which led to his arrest. Sinatra had numerous extramarital affairs, and gossip magazines published details of affairs with women including Marilyn Maxwell, Lana Turner, and Joi Lansing.

Sinatra was married to Hollywood actress Ava Gardner from 1951 to 1957. It was a turbulent marriage with many well-publicized fights and altercations. The couple formally announced their separation on October 29, 1953, through MGM. Gardner filed for divorce in June 1954, at a time when she was dating matador Luis Miguel Dominguín, but the divorce was not settled until 1957. Sinatra continued to feel very strongly for her, and they remained friends for life. He was still dealing with her finances in 1976.

Sinatra reportedly broke off engagements to Lauren Bacall in 1958 and Juliet Prowse in 1962. He was also romantically linked to Pat Sheehan, Vikki Dougan, and Kipp Hamilton. He married Mia Farrow on July 19, 1966, a short marriage that ended with divorce in Mexico in August 1968. They remained close friends for life, and in a 2013 interview Farrow said that Sinatra might be the father of her son Ronan Farrow (born 1987). In a 2015 CBS Sunday Morning interview, Nancy Sinatra dismissed the claim as "nonsense".

Sinatra was married to Barbara Marx from 1976 until his death. The couple married on July 11, 1976, at Sunnylands, in Rancho Mirage, California, the estate of media magnate Walter Annenberg.

Sinatra was close friends with Jilly Rizzo, songwriter Jimmy Van Heusen, golfer Ken Venturi, comedian Pat Henry and baseball manager Leo Durocher. In his spare time, he enjoyed listening to classical music and attended concerts when he could. He swam daily in the Pacific Ocean, finding it to be therapeutic and giving him much-needed solitude. He often played golf with Venturi at the course in Palm Springs, where he lived, and liked painting, reading, and building model railways.

Though Sinatra was critical of the Church on numerous occasions and had a pantheistic, Einstein-like view of God in his earlier life, he was inducted into the Catholic Sovereign Military Order of Malta in 1976, and he turned to Catholicism for healing after his mother died in a plane crash in 1977. He died as a practicing Catholic and had a Catholic burial.

Style and personality 
Sinatra was known for his immaculate sense of style. He spent lavishly on expensive custom-tailored tuxedos and stylish pin-striped suits, which made him feel wealthy and important, and that he was giving his very best to the audience. He was also obsessed with cleanliness—while with the Tommy Dorsey band he developed the nickname "Lady Macbeth", because of frequent showering and switching his outfits. His deep blue eyes earned him the popular nickname "Ol' Blue Eyes".

For Santopietro, Sinatra was the personification of America in the 1950s: "cocky, eye on the main chance, optimistic, and full of the sense of possibility". Barbara Sinatra wrote, "A big part of Frank's thrill was the sense of danger that he exuded, an underlying, ever-present tension only those closest to him knew could be defused with humor".  Cary Grant, a friend of Sinatra, stated that Sinatra was the "most honest person he'd ever met", who spoke "a simple truth, without artifice which scared people", and was often moved to tears by his performances.  Jo-Caroll Dennison commented that he possessed "great inner strength", and that his energy and drive were "enormous". A workaholic, he reportedly only slept four hours a night on average. Throughout his life, Sinatra had mood swings and bouts of mild to severe depression, stating to an interviewer in the 1950s that "I have an over-acute capacity for sadness as well as elation". Barbara Sinatra stated that he would "snap at anyone for the slightest misdemeanor", while Van Heusen said that when Sinatra got drunk it was "best to disappear".

Sinatra's mood swings often developed into violence, directed at people he felt had crossed him, particularly journalists who gave him scathing reviews, publicists, and photographers. According to Rojek he was "capable of deeply offensive behavior that smacked of a persecution complex". He received negative press for fights with Lee Mortimer in 1947, photographer Eddie Schisser in Houston in 1950, Judy Garland's publicist Jim Byron on the Sunset Strip in 1954, and for a confrontation with Washington Post journalist Maxine Cheshire in 1973, in which he implied that she was a cheap prostitute.

His feud with then-Chicago Sun Times columnist Mike Royko began when Royko wrote a column questioning why Chicago police offered free protection to Sinatra when the singer had his own security. Sinatra fired off an angry letter in response calling Royko a "pimp", and threatening to "punch you in the mouth" for speculating that he wore a toupée. Royko auctioned the letter, the proceeds going to the Salvation Army. The winner of the auction was Vie Carlson, mother of Bun E. Carlos of the rock group Cheap Trick. After appearing on Antiques Roadshow, Carlson consigned the letter to Freeman's Auctioneers & Appraisers, which auctioned it in 2010.

Sinatra was also known for his generosity, particularly after his comeback. Kelley notes that when Lee J. Cobb nearly died from a heart attack in June 1955, Sinatra flooded him with "books, flowers, delicacies", paid his hospital bills, and visited him daily, telling him that his "finest acting" was yet to come. In another instance, after an argument with manager Bobby Burns, rather than apologize, Sinatra bought him a brand new Cadillac.

Alleged organized-crime links and Cal Neva Lodge 

Sinatra became the stereotype of the "tough working-class Italian American," something which he embraced. He said that if it had not been for his interest in music, he would have likely ended up in a life of crime. Willie Moretti was Sinatra's godfather and the notorious underboss of the Genovese crime family, and he helped Sinatra in exchange for kickbacks and was reported to have intervened in releasing Sinatra from his contract with Tommy Dorsey. Sinatra was present at the Mafia Havana Conference in 1946, and the press learned of his being there with Lucky Luciano. One newspaper published the headline "Shame, Sinatra". He was reported to be a good friend of mobster Sam Giancana, and the two men were seen playing golf together. Kelley quotes Jo-Carrol Silvers that Sinatra "adored" Bugsy Siegel, and boasted to friends about him and how many people Siegel had killed. Kelley says that Sinatra and mobster Joseph Fischetti had been good friends from 1938 onward, and acted like "Sicilian brothers". She also states that Sinatra and Hank Sanicola were financial partners with Mickey Cohen in the gossip magazine Hollywood Night Life.

The FBI kept records amounting to 2,403 pages on Sinatra, who was a natural target with his alleged Mafia ties, his ardent New Deal politics, and his friendship with John F. Kennedy. The FBI kept him under surveillance for almost five decades beginning in the 1940s. The documents include accounts of Sinatra as the target of death threats and extortion schemes. The FBI documented that Sinatra was losing esteem with the Mafia as he grew closer to President Kennedy, whose younger brother Attorney General Robert F. Kennedy was leading a crackdown on organized crime. Sinatra said he was not involved: "Any report that I fraternized with goons or racketeers is a vicious lie".

In 1960, Sinatra bought a share in the Cal Neva Lodge & Casino, a casino hotel that straddles the California-Nevada state line on the north shores of Lake Tahoe. Sinatra built the Celebrity Room theater which attracted his show business friends Red Skelton, Marilyn Monroe, Victor Borge, Joe E. Lewis, Lucille Ball, Lena Horne, Juliet Prowse, the McGuire Sisters, and others. By 1962, he reportedly held a 50-percent share in the hotel. Sinatra's gambling license was temporarily stripped by the Nevada Gaming Control Board in 1963 after Giancana was spotted on the premises. Due to ongoing pressure from the FBI and Nevada Gaming Commission on mobster control of casinos, Sinatra agreed to give up his share in Cal Neva and the Sands. That year, his son Frank Jr. was kidnapped but was eventually released unharmed. Sinatra's gambling license was restored in February 1981, following support from Ronald Reagan.

Politics and activism 

Sinatra held varied political views throughout his life. His mother, Dolly Sinatra (1896–1977), was a Democratic Party ward leader, and after meeting President Franklin D. Roosevelt in 1944, he subsequently heavily campaigned for the Democrats in the 1944 presidential election. According to Jo Carroll Silvers, in his younger years Sinatra had "ardent liberal" sympathies, and was "so concerned about poor people that he was always quoting Henry Wallace". He was outspoken against racism, particularly toward black people and Italians, from a young age. In the early 1950s, he was among those who campaigned to combine the racially segregated musicians unions in Los Angeles.  In November 1945 Sinatra was invited by the mayor of Gary, Indiana, to try to settle a strike by white students of Froebel High School against the "Pro-Negro" policies of the new principal. His comments, while praised by liberal publications, led to accusations by some that he was a Communist, which he said were not true. In the 1948 presidential election, Sinatra actively campaigned for President Harry S. Truman. In 1952 and 1956, he also campaigned for Adlai Stevenson.

Of all the U.S. presidents he associated with during his career, he was closest to John F. Kennedy. Sinatra often invited Kennedy to Hollywood and Las Vegas, and the two would womanize and enjoy parties together. In January 1961, Sinatra and Peter Lawford organized the Inaugural Gala in Washington, D.C., held on the evening before President Kennedy was sworn into office. After taking office, Kennedy distanced himself from Sinatra, due in part to the singer's ties with the Mafia. His brother Robert, who was serving as Attorney General and was known for urging FBI director J. Edgar Hoover to conduct more crackdowns on the Mafia, was distrustful of Sinatra.

In 1962, Sinatra was snubbed by the President as, during his visit to his Palm Springs, Kennedy stayed with the Republican Bing Crosby instead of Sinatra, citing FBI concerns about the latter's alleged connections to organized crime. Crosby's affiliations with the mafia were less publicly known. Sinatra had spared no expense upgrading the facilities at his home in anticipation of the President's visit, fitting it with a heliport, which he smashed with a sledgehammer after the rejection. Despite the snub, when he learned of Kennedy's assassination he reportedly sobbed in his bedroom for three days.

Sinatra worked with Hubert H. Humphrey in 1968, and remained a supporter of the Democratic Party until the early 1970s. Although still a registered Democrat, Sinatra endorsed Republican Ronald Reagan for a second term as Governor of California in 1970. He officially changed allegiance in July 1972 when he supported Richard Nixon for re-election in the 1972 presidential election.

In the 1980 presidential election, Sinatra supported Ronald Reagan and donated $4million to Reagan's campaign. Sinatra arranged Reagan's Presidential gala, as he had done for Kennedy 20 years previously. In 1985, Reagan presented Sinatra with the Presidential Medal of Freedom, remarking, "His love of country, his generosity for those less fortunate... make him one of our most remarkable and distinguished Americans."

Santopietro notes that Sinatra was a "lifelong sympathizer with Jewish causes". He was awarded the Hollzer Memorial Award by the Los Angeles Jewish Community in 1949. He gave a series of concerts in Israel in 1962, and donated his entire $50,000 fee for appearing in a cameo role in Cast a Giant Shadow (1966) to the Youth Center in Jerusalem. On November 1, 1972, he raised $6.5million in bond pledges for Israel, and was given the Medallion of Valor for his efforts. The Frank Sinatra Student Center at the Hebrew University of Jerusalem was dedicated in his name in 1978. He owned a Jewish skullcap, known as a kippah or yarmulkah, which was sold as part of his wife's estate many years after his death.

From his youth, Sinatra displayed sympathy for African Americans and worked both publicly and privately all his life to help the struggle for equal rights. He blamed racial prejudice on the parents of children. Sinatra played a major role in the desegregation of Nevada hotels and casinos in the 1950s and 1960s. At the Sands in 1955, Sinatra went against policy by inviting Nat King Cole into the dining room, and in 1961, after an incident where an African-American couple entered the lobby of the hotel and were blocked by the security guard, Sinatra and Davis forced the hotel management to begin hiring black waiters and busboys. On January 27, 1961, Sinatra played a benefit show at Carnegie Hall for Martin Luther King Jr. and led his fellow Rat Pack members and Reprise label mates in boycotting hotels and casinos that refused entry to black patrons and performers. According to his son, Frank Jr., King sat weeping in the audience at one of his father's concerts in 1963 as Sinatra sang "Ol' Man River", a song from the musical Show Boat that is sung by an African-American stevedore. When he changed his political affiliations in 1970, Sinatra became less outspoken on racial issues. Though he did much towards civil rights causes, it did not stop the occasional racial jibe from him and the other Rat Pack members toward Davis at concerts.

Death and funeral 

Sinatra died at Cedars-Sinai Medical Center in Los Angeles on May 14, 1998, aged 82, with his wife at his side after suffering two heart attacks. Sinatra was in ill health during the last few years of his life, and was frequently hospitalized for heart and breathing problems, high blood pressure, pneumonia and bladder cancer. He also suffered from dementia-like symptoms due to his usage of antidepressants. He had made no public appearances following a heart attack in February 1997. Sinatra's wife encouraged him to "fight" while attempts were made to stabilize him, and reported that his final words were, "I'm losing." Sinatra's daughter, Tina, later wrote that she and her siblings (Frank Jr. and Nancy) had not been notified of their father's final hospitalization, and it was her belief that "the omission was deliberate. Barbara would be the grieving widow alone at her husband's side." The night after Sinatra's death, the lights on the Empire State Building in New York City were turned blue, the lights at the Las Vegas Strip were dimmed in his honor, and the casinos stopped spinning for one minute.

Sinatra's funeral was held at the Church of the Good Shepherd in Beverly Hills, California, on May 20, 1998, with 400 mourners in attendance and thousands of fans outside. Gregory Peck, Tony Bennett, and Sinatra's son, Frank Jr., addressed the mourners, who included many notable people from film and entertainment. Sinatra was buried in a blue business suit and his grave was adorned with mementos from family members—cherry-flavored Life Savers, Tootsie Rolls, a bottle of Jack Daniel's, a pack of Camel cigarettes, a Zippo lighter, stuffed toys, a dog biscuit, and a roll of dimes that he always carried—next to his parents in section B-8 of Desert Memorial Park in Cathedral City, California.

His close friends Jilly Rizzo and Jimmy Van Heusen are buried nearby. The words "The Best Is Yet to Come", plus "Beloved Husband & Father" were imprinted on Sinatra's original grave marker. Sinatra's gravestone was changed under mysterious circumstances according to the magazine Palm Springs Life. The  grave currently reads "Sleep Warm Poppa". Significant increases in recording sales worldwide were reported by Billboard in the month of his death.

Influence and popularity 
Throughout his professional career, Sinatra recorded more than 1,300 songs and participated in more than fifty films. He was called the Chairman of the Board. He was responsible for awakening a fan phenomenon made up of hysterical teenage girls called "Bobby Soxers", who were portrayed as very enthusiastic to the point of hysteria. Newspapers at the time highlighted the Bobby soxers' great fanaticism and passion for Sinatra; they experienced hunger, fatigue, and dizziness while waiting in line to see him.

The United States Postal Service issued a 42-cent postage stamp honoring Sinatra in May 2008, commemorating the tenth anniversary of his death. May 13 is considered "Frank Sinatra Day."

In Frank Sinatra Park, a 6-foot (1.80-meter) tall bronze statue honoring Sinatra was erected in the year 2021 on December 12. There are also several streets and highways in the US named after Sinatra.

Legacy and honors 

Robert Christgau referred to Sinatra as "the greatest singer of the 20th century". His popularity is matched only by Bing Crosby, Elvis Presley, The Beatles, and Michael Jackson. For Santopietro, Sinatra was the "greatest male pop singer in the history of America", who amassed "unprecedented power onscreen and off", and "seemed to exemplify the common man, an ethnic twentieth-century American male who reached the 'top of the heap', yet never forgot his roots". Santopietro argues that Sinatra created his own world, which he was able to dominate—his career was centred around power, perfecting the ability to capture an audience. Encyclopædia Britannica referred to Sinatra as "often hailed as the greatest American singer of 20th-century popular music....Through his life and his art, he transcended the status of mere icon to become one of the most recognizable symbols of American culture."

Gus Levene commented that Sinatra's strength was that when it came to lyrics, telling a story musically, Sinatra displayed a "genius" ability and feeling, which with the "rare combination of voice and showmanship" made him the "original singer" which others who followed most tried to emulate. George Roberts, a trombonist in Sinatra's band, remarked that Sinatra had a "charisma, or whatever it is about him, that no one else had". Biographer Arnold Shaw considered that "If Las Vegas had not existed, Sinatra could have invented it". He quoted reporter James Bacon in saying that Sinatra was the "swinging image on which the town is built", adding that no other entertainer quite "embodied the glamour" associated with Las Vegas as him. Sinatra continues to be seen as one of the icons of the 20th century,
and has three stars on the Hollywood Walk of Fame for his work in film and music. There are stars on east and west sides of the 1600 block of Vine Street respectively, and one on the south side of the 6500 block of Hollywood Boulevard for his work in television.

In Sinatra's native Hoboken, he was awarded the Key to the City of by Mayor Fred M. De Sapio on October 30, 1947. In 2003 the city's main post office was rededicated in his honor. A bronze plaque, place two years before Sinatra's death in 1998, marks the site of the house where he was born. There is also a marker in front of Hoboken Historical Museum, which has artifacts from his life and conducts Sinatra walking tours through the city. Frank Sinatra Drive runs parallel to the Hudson River Waterfront Walkway. On the waterfront is Frank Sinatra Park, where a bronze plaque was placed in 1989 upon its opening.
A residence hall at Montclair State University in New Jersey was named in his honor. Other buildings named for Sinatra include the Frank Sinatra School of the Arts in Astoria, Queens, the Frank Sinatra International Student Center at Israel's Hebrew University in Jerusalem dedicated in 1978, and the Frank Sinatra Hall at the USC School of Cinematic Arts in Los Angeles, California, dedicated in 2002. Wynn Resorts' Encore Las Vegas resort features a restaurant dedicated to Sinatra which opened in 2008.

There are several streets and roads named in honor of Frank Sinatra in several states of the U.S., such as the road named Frank Sinatra Drive connecting Cathedral City and Palm Desert in California, a road in Las Vegas near the Las Vegas Strip is also a road named Frank Sinatra Drive in his honor.

Various items of memorabilia from Sinatra's life and career, such as Frank Sinatra's awards, gold records, and various personal items are displayed at USC's Frank Sinatra Hall in Los Angeles and also at Wynn Resort's Sinatra restaurant in Las Vegas.

The United States Postal Service issued a 42-cent postage stamp in honor of Sinatra in May 2008, commemorating the tenth anniversary of his death.
The United States Congress passed a resolution introduced by Representative Mary Bono Mack on May 20, 2008, designating May 13 as Frank Sinatra Day to honor his contributions to American culture.

Sinatra received three Honorary Degrees during his lifetime. In May 1976, he was invited to speak at the University of Nevada, Las Vegas (UNLV) graduation commencement held at Sam Boyd Stadium. It was at this commencement that he was bestowed an Honorary Doctorate litterarum humanarum by the university. During his speech, Sinatra stated that his education had come from "the school of hard knocks" and was suitably touched by the award. He went on to describe that "this is the first educational degree I have ever held in my hand. I will never forget what you have done for me today". A few years later in 1984 and 1985, Sinatra also received an Honorary Doctorate of Fine Arts from Loyola Marymount University as well as an Honorary Doctorate of Engineering from the Stevens Institute of Technology.

Film and television portrayals 
Sinatra has also been portrayed on numerous occasions in film and television. A television miniseries based on Sinatra's life, titled Sinatra, was aired by CBS in 1992. The series was directed by James Steven Sadwith, who won an Emmy Award for Outstanding Individual Achievement in Directing for a Miniseries or a Special, and starred Philip Casnoff as Sinatra. Sinatra was written by Abby Mann and Philip Mastrosimone, and produced by Sinatra's daughter, Tina.

Sinatra has subsequently been portrayed on screen by Ray Liotta (The Rat Pack, 1998), James Russo (Stealing Sinatra, 2003), Dennis Hopper (The Night We Called It a Day, 2003), and Robert Knepper (My Way, 2012), and spoofed by Joe Piscopo and Phil Hartman on Saturday Night Live. A biographical film directed by Martin Scorsese has long been planned. A 1998 episode of the BBC documentary series Arena, The Voice of the Century, focused on Sinatra. Alex Gibney directed a four-part biographical series on Sinatra, All or Nothing at All, for HBO in 2015. A musical tribute was aired on CBS television in December 2015 to mark Sinatra's centenary.  Sinatra was also portrayed by Rico Simonini in the 2018 feature film Frank & Ava, which is based on a play by Willard Manus.

Sinatra was convinced that Johnny Fontane, a mob-associated singer in Mario Puzo's novel The Godfather (1969), was based on his life. Puzo wrote in 1972 that when the author and singer met in Chasen's, Sinatra "started to shout abuse", calling Puzo a "pimp" and threatening physical violence. This was recreated in the miniseries The Offer with Sinatra portrayed by Frank John Hughes. Francis Ford Coppola, director of the film adaptation, said in the audio commentary that "Obviously Johnny Fontane was inspired by a kind of Frank Sinatra character".

In December 2020, it was announced that Creed singer Scott Stapp will portray Frank Sinatra in Reagan, a biopic of U.S. President Ronald Reagan.

Discography 

 The Voice of Frank Sinatra (1946)
 Songs by Sinatra (1947)
 Christmas Songs by Sinatra (1948)
 Frankly Sentimental (1949)
 Dedicated to You (1950)
 Sing and Dance with Frank Sinatra (1950)
 Songs for Young Lovers (1954)
 Swing Easy! (1954)
 In the Wee Small Hours (1955)
 Songs for Swingin' Lovers! (1956)
 Close to You (1957)
 A Swingin' Affair! (1957)
 Where Are You? (1957)
 A Jolly Christmas from Frank Sinatra (1957)
 Come Fly with Me (1958)
 Frank Sinatra Sings for Only the Lonely (1958)
 Come Dance with Me! (1959)
 No One Cares (1959)
 Nice 'n' Easy (1960)
 Sinatra's Swingin' Session!!! (1961)
 Ring-a-Ding-Ding! (1961)
 Come Swing with Me! (1961)
 Swing Along With Me (1961)
 I Remember Tommy (1961)
 Sinatra and Strings (1962)
 Point of No Return (1962)
 Sinatra and Swingin' Brass (1962)
 All Alone (1962)
 Sinatra Sings Great Songs from Great Britain (1962)
 Sinatra–Basie: An Historic Musical First with Count Basie (1962)
 The Concert Sinatra (1963)
 Sinatra's Sinatra (1963)
 Sinatra Sings Days of Wine and Roses, Moon River, and Other Academy Award Winners (1964)
 America, I Hear You Singing with Bing Crosby and Fred Waring (1964)
 It Might as Well Be Swing with Count Basie (1964)
 12 Songs of Christmas with Bing Crosby and Fred Waring (1964)
 Softly, as I Leave You (1964)
 September of My Years (1965)
 Sentimental Journey (1965)
 My Kind of Broadway (1965)
 A Man and His Music (1965)
 Moonlight Sinatra (1966)
 Strangers in the Night (1966)
 That's Life (1966)
 Francis Albert Sinatra & Antonio Carlos Jobim with Antonio Carlos Jobim (1967)
 The World We Knew (1967)
 Francis A. & Edward K. with Duke Ellington (1968)
 The Sinatra Family Wish You a Merry Christmas with Frank Sinatra Jr., Nancy Sinatra and Tina Sinatra (1968)
 Cycles (1968)
 My Way (1969)
 A Man Alone (1969)
 Watertown (1970)
 Sinatra & Company with Antonio Carlos Jobim (1971)
 Ol' Blue Eyes Is Back (1973)
 Some Nice Things I've Missed (1974)
 Trilogy: Past Present Future (1980)
 She Shot Me Down (1981)
 L.A. Is My Lady (1984)
 Duets (1993)
 Duets II (1994)

See also 
 Frank Sinatra bibliography
 Frank Sinatra's recorded legacy
 The Frank Sinatra Show (radio program)

Notes

References

Sources

Further reading 
 Freedland, Michael (1998). All the Way: A Biography of Frank Sinatra. St. Martin's Press. 
 Kaplan, James (2015). Sinatra: The chairman. New York: Doubleday. 
 Pickard, Roy (1994). Frank Sinatra at the Movies. Hale.

External links 

 
 Sinatra family website 
 Frank Sinatra at Curlie
 Frank Sinatra webradio
 
 
 Sinatra at the New Jersey Hall of Fame
 
 
 Frank Sinatra at FBI Records: The Vault
 The Sinatra Report, a special section of Billboard's November 20, 1965, issue – beginning immediately after page 34
"Sinatra in Retrospective, Parts 1 and 2," WXXI Public Broadcasting, The Walter J. Brown Media Archives & Peabody Awards Collection at the University of Georgia, American Archive of Public Broadcasting

 
Frank Sinatra
1915 births
1998 deaths
20th-century American male actors
20th-century American singers
Activists for African-American civil rights
American baritones
American crooners
American film producers
American jazz singers
American male film actors
American male jazz musicians
American male pop singers
American male radio actors
American male singers
American male songwriters
American male voice actors
American people of Italian descent
American Roman Catholics
American philanthropists
Analysands of Ralph Greenson
Best Musical or Comedy Actor Golden Globe (film) winners
Best Supporting Actor Academy Award winners
Best Supporting Actor Golden Globe (film) winners
Burials at Desert Memorial Park
California Democrats
California Republicans
Capitol Records artists
Catholics from New Jersey
Cecil B. DeMille Award Golden Globe winners
Columbia Records artists
Congressional Gold Medal recipients
Converts to Roman Catholicism from atheism or agnosticism
Film directors from New Jersey
Film producers from New Jersey
Grammy Award winners
Grammy Legend Award winners
Grammy Lifetime Achievement Award winners
Grand Officers of the Order of Merit of the Italian Republic
Hoboken High School alumni
Jazz musicians from New Jersey
Jazz-pop singers
Jean Hersholt Humanitarian Award winners
Kennedy Center honorees
Knights of Malta
Las Vegas shows
Male actors from New Jersey
Metro-Goldwyn-Mayer contract players
Musicians from Hoboken, New Jersey
New Jersey Democrats
New Jersey Hall of Fame inductees
New Jersey Republicans
Peabody Award winners
Presidential Medal of Freedom recipients
Qwest Records artists
RCA Victor artists
Recipients of the Austrian Cross of Honour for Science and Art, 1st class
Reprise Records artists
Screen Actors Guild Life Achievement Award
Sinatra family
Singers from New Jersey
Songwriters from New Jersey
Swing singers
The Pied Pipers members
Traditional pop music singers
Warner Records artists